The National Gallery Singapore, often known exonymously as the National Gallery, is a public institution and national museum dedicated to art and culture located in the Civic District of Singapore. It oversees the world's largest public collection of Singaporean and regional art of the Eastern world, specifically of Southeast Asia, with a collection of more than 9,000 items. 

The Gallery aims to provide an understanding and appreciation of art and culture through a variety of media, focusing on Singapore's culture and heritage and its relationship with other Asian cultures and the world. A total cost of approximately S$532 million has gone into the National Gallery Singapore's development. 

For the breadth, scope, and magnitude of its collections, the National Gallery Singapore is widely considered by art enthusiasts as being one of the greatest art museums in Singapore and the region. Subsequently, it is one of the most visited art museums in the world, often attracting almost two million visitors annually. Admission to the National Gallery Singapore is complimentary for Singaporean citizens and permanent residents.

The National Gallery also houses various restaurants that has won global accolades. These include Odette, a restaurant that has been rated as being one of the best in Asia – in addition to having three Michelin stars, as well as the National Kitchen by Violet Oon.

History

Planning
At his National Day Rally speech on 21 August 2005, Prime Minister Lee Hsien Loong mentioned the government's plan to convert the former Supreme Court building and City Hall into a new national gallery. On 2 September 2006, Dr. Lee Boon Yang, Minister for Information, Communications and the Arts officially announced the setting up of the National Gallery Singapore during the Singapore Biennale 2006 at the National Museum of Singapore.

The then Ministry of Information, Communications and the Arts (MICA) proceeded to implement a process designed to enable stakeholders and interested parties to contribute their expertise and their views to the project. A steering committee, initially chaired by Dr. Balaji Sadasivan, Senior Minister of State for the Ministry of Foreign Affairs and MICA, oversaw the art gallery's implementation plan. The steering committee was supported by an executive committee and four advisory groups. The advisory groups provided advice on museology, architectural conservation, finance and communications.

Design competition
On 23 February 2007, MICA, together with the Singapore Institute of Architects, launched a two-stage architectural design competition to identify the most suitable architect and design for the National Gallery. The first stage of the competition called for design and concept proposals, and began on 19 March with a site tour of the two buildings for competing architects to get design concepts and ideas. It drew 111 entries from 29 countries worldwide, with five proposals shortlisted in May 2007. Members of the jury consisted of a panel of eminent local and international professionals headed by Tommy Koh, Singapore's Ambassador-at-Large and chairman of the National Heritage Board, and included officials from the Urban Redevelopment Authority, Musée national des Arts asiatiques-Guimet in France and the Asian Civilisations Museum.

For the second stage, the shortlisted candidates had to develop their designs, from which the winning proposal would be selected by the jury. Due to the status of the former Supreme Court Building and City Hall as national monuments, certain aspects of the buildings could not be altered, such as the façade, the Surrender Chamber, the office of Singapore's founding Prime Minister and the panelling in four rooms of the Supreme Court. However, this still left many design options open such as the addition of roof and basement floors. The participants also had to submit entries within a budget of S$320 million.

On 29 August 2007, the seven-member international jury panel named the top three designs out of the five shortlisted. The three firms – Studio Milou Architecture from France, Ho + Hou Architects from Taiwan, and Chan Sau Yan Associates from Singapore – each received $150,000. The jury made their decision after appraising models and digital mock-ups, as well as engaging the five finalists in a presentation and question-and-answer session. The other two firms that were shortlisted in the first stage were DP Architects and Australia's Smart Design Studio.

An exhibition of the five finalists' proposals was held at City Hall in October 2007, and the public was invited to give feedback on the designs, programmes and events. The jury's decision was presented to MICA, which then decided on whom to commission to design and build the art gallery. An announcement on the final design was made in the first quarter of 2008.

Competition winner and construction
In May 2008, Studio Milou Singapore, in partnership with CPG Consultants (Singapore), was appointed to design and build the Gallery.

Studio Milou Architecture is a French architectural firm, with branches in Paris and Singapore that specialise in the design of museums and cultural spaces.

CPG Consultants, a subsidiary of CPG Corporation, is a multi-disciplinary design consultancy firm. Headquartered in Singapore, CPG Consultants has extensive expertise in conservation and preservation of buildings. To date, the company has completed over 20 such projects in Singapore, most of which are gazetted monuments.

Studio Milou Architecture's design consisted of a linear draped canopy supported by tree-like columns to link the former Supreme Court Building and City Hall at the roof level. The design incorporated an extended staircase linking the basement to the upper levels, making use of solar energy to provide electricity. Fine metal mesh had been proposed to cover most of City Hall. Panel members agreed it had "the most delightful design and appeal", and was ranked first among the top three designs.

On 21 December 2010, the Gallery appointed Takenaka-Singapore Piling Joint Venture as the main construction contractor for the new Gallery. The construction works on the buildings began in January 2011 and opened its doors to the public officially on 24 November 2015.

Buildings
The museum is composed of a combination of the Old Supreme Court Building and City Hall, both of which are national monuments and have played significant roles in Singapore's history. The buildings face the Padang, an open field. Through link bridges and a new basement level, the design for the National Gallery integrates the City Hall and former Supreme Court buildings, combining both old and new architecture.

The Old Supreme Court Building was built on the site of the former Grand Hotel de l'Europe, one of the most palatial hotels in Southeast Asia that was demolished in 1936. Designed by Frank Dorrington Ward, Chief Architect of the Public Works Department, the former Supreme Court building was built to house Supreme Court offices and courtrooms and was declared open on 3 August 1939. This building is the former courthouse of the Supreme Court of Singapore, before it moved into the new building on 20 June 2005. The architecture of the former Supreme Court building is in harmony with that of its neighbour, City Hall. The general layout of the building exemplifies British colonial architecture, comprising four blocks of offices and courtrooms surrounding a central rotunda with a dome that was originally used to house a circular law library. It was to be the last classical building to be built in Singapore. United Engineers Ltd was the building contractor. The Corinthian and Ionic columns, sculptures and relief panels were the works of Italian artist, Cavaliere Rudolfo Nolli. There are the tympanum sculptures and ornamented frieze panels.

The City Hall building was constructed between 1926 and 1929 and was originally known as the Municipal Building. Designed by the British Municipal architects A. Gordon and S. D. Meadows, it was used to house the offices of the Municipal Council, which was responsible for the provision of water, electricity, gas, roads, bridges and street lighting. From 1963 to 1991, City Hall came to house offices of several government departments and courtrooms. The building was vacated in 2006. City Hall has been the focal point of many important events in the history of Singapore. It was in the City Hall building that Admiral Lord Louis Mountbatten, on behalf of the Allied forces, accepted the surrender of the Japanese forces on 12 September 1945. 

The building also housed the office of Mr. Lee Kuan Yew, the first prime minister of Singapore. Mr. Lee and members of his Cabinet took their Oaths of Allegiance and Oaths of Office on 5 June 1959 in the City Hall Chamber. It was gazetted on 14 February 1992 as a national monument.
The original layout of City Hall is a typical example of neoclassical British architecture. The building's interior is modestly proportioned, but its front façade is distinguished by 18 three-storey-high Corinthian columns facing the Padang.

Galleries 

Consisting of modern and contemporary art, National Gallery Singapore focuses on displaying Singapore and Southeast Asian art from the 19th century to present day. It is home to two permanent galleries: the Singapore Gallery and the Southeast Asia Gallery. Through its collection, the Gallery will present the development of Singaporean and regional cultures – telling the story of their social, economic and political histories.

The Gallery mainly draws from Singapore's National Collection, the world's largest public collection of modern and contemporary Southeast Asian art. The National Collection started with an original bequest of 93 works made to the National Museum in 1976, by the well-known cinema magnate and art patron, Dato Loke Wan Tho. Through careful nurturing over the years, this collection has grown significantly to approximately 8,000 pieces in 2010. The National Heritage Board is presently the custodian of this collection.
National Gallery Singapore will feature works by major Singaporean artists such as Georgette Chen, Chen Chong Swee, Chen Wen Hsi, Cheong Soo Pieng and Liu Kang. The collection now spans from early-20th-century naturalistic paintings to contemporary video installations. The collection also holds pieces from Southeast Asian artists of international standing, such as Affandi (Indonesia), Latiff Mohidin (Malaysia), Le Pho (Vietnam), Montien Boonma (Thailand), Fernando Cueto Amorsolo (Philippines) and Raden Saleh (Indonesia).

Singapore Gallery 

The Singapore Gallery is a platform for studying and presenting the cultural and aesthetic identity of Singapore from the ancient period to present day.

Southeast Asia Gallery 
Housed in the former Supreme Court building, the Southeast Asia Gallery presents the history of Southeast Asian art, starting in the 19th century.

Special set of Research Galleries 
These galleries complement the core galleries, providing space for curators and researchers to experiment with ways of presenting materials from the Gallery's permanent collection.

Changing gallery spaces 

Docents 
One of the public programmes offered by the Gallery is the Docent Programme, a training workshop in art, history and culture.
The programme seeks to cultivate a pool of volunteer guides. They are trained in public speaking and have extensive knowledge of Singaporean and Southeast Asian art, and the architecture and history of the Gallery buildings.

Keppel Centre for Art Education
The Keppel Centre for Art Education is a learning facility for families and schools. The centre will provide an artistic environment that stimulates imagination, encourages active play and supports independent learning. 

Children and younger students will experience and interact with original artworks that are specially created to develop observation skills and tactile exploration.

The Keppel Centre for Art Education also offers programmes including a regular series of Studio-based workshops, artist talks, curator's presentations, as well as complimentary Drop-in programmes conducted by artists, curators and museum educators.

Exhibitions at the National Gallery Singapore 

An exhibition, “The Gift”, opened from 20 August to 9 November 2021 and explored the complexities of gifts in art-making and collecting. It was a partnership with three other arts institutions: Galeri Nasional Indonesia, MAIIAM Contemporary Art Museum in Thailand and Nationalgalerie – Staatliche Museen zu Berlin, which was initiated by the Goethe Institut. Each museum curated a selection of works from their own and each other’s collections that were on display simultaneously.

In mid-2022, the gallery opened a major exhibition, called Ever Present: First Peoples Art of Australia, which is the most extensive show of contemporary Indigenous Australian art type to tour Asia.

Exhibitions held at the Singapore Art Museum
While waiting for the building to complete its renovations, National Gallery Singapore has held various exhibitions at the Singapore Art Museum. These exhibitions include:

Travelling shows and artworks
Apart from displays within Singapore, the National Collection has also travelled to international museums and exhibition venues in the Americas, Europe and Asia.

In popular culture
The gallery is featured in HBO series Westworld, as part of the third season.

Gallery

See also
List of national galleries
National Heritage Board (Singapore)
Singapore Art Museum
National Museum of Singapore

References

Further reading

Bibliography
National Art Gallery, Singapore, 2009. Light & Movement Portrayed: The Art of Anthony Poon. 
Yeo Wei Wei (editor), 2010. Realism in Asia Volume One. National Art Gallery, Singapore. 
National Art Gallery, Singapore, 2010. The Story of Yeh Chi Wei. 
Grace Tng, Seng Yu Jin & Yeo Wei Wei, 2010. Cheong Soo Pieng: Visions of Southeast Asia. National Art Gallery, Singapore. 
Yeo Wei Wei & Ye Shufang, 2010. Salted Fish. National Art Gallery, Singapore. 
National Art Gallery, Singapore, 2010. When I Grow Up I Want to Paint Like Cheong Soo Pieng (CSP Colouring Book). 
Sara Siew (ed), 2011. Liu Kang: Essays on Art and Culture. National Art Gallery, Singapore. 
Yeo Wei Wei (ed), 2011. Asian Artists Series – Liu Kang: Colourful Modernist. National Art Gallery, Singapore. 
National Art Gallery, Singapore, 2011. When I Grow Up I Want to Paint Like Liu Kang. 
Natalie Hennedige, 2012. Koko The Great. National Art Gallery, Singapore. 
Ho Lee- Ling, 2013. Who is Cheong Soo Pieng? National Art Gallery, Singapore. 
Sara Siew, 2013. Awesome Art. National Art Gallery, Singapore. 
Mechtild Widrich, 2016. The Naked Museum. The Naked Museum: Art, Urbanism, and Global Positioning in Singapore, Art Journal, 75:2, 46–65.

External links

360 Virtual Gallery The Straits Times National Gallery Singapore
Virtual tour of the National Gallery Singapore provided by Google Arts & Culture

2015 establishments in Singapore
Art museums and galleries in Singapore
Art museums established in 2015
Downtown Core (Singapore)
National museums of Singapore
Singapore